Barber Farm, also known as Luckland, is a historic farm complex and national historic district located near Cleveland, Rowan County, North Carolina.  The Jacob Barber House was built about 1855, and is a two-story, single-pile, three-bay vernacular Greek Revival style frame dwelling. It has a one-story rear ell and a one-story shed roofed rear porch. Its builder James Graham also built the Robert Knox House and the Hall Family House. Other contributing resources are the cow barn (c. 1947), smokehouse (c. 1880 / 1940s), granary (c. 1855), double crib log barn (c. 1855), well house (c. 1940), log corn crib / barn (c. 1855 / 1940), carriage house (c. 1890), school (c. 1910), Edward W. Barber House (1870s), Edward W. Barber Well House (1870s), North Carolina Midland Railroad Right-of-Way (c. 1899), and the agricultural landscape.

It was listed on the National Register of Historic Places in 2003.

References

Farms on the National Register of Historic Places in North Carolina
Historic districts on the National Register of Historic Places in North Carolina
Greek Revival houses in North Carolina
Houses completed in 1855
Buildings and structures in Rowan County, North Carolina
National Register of Historic Places in Rowan County, North Carolina